Shimpal Lelisi (born ) is a New Zealand actor and TV presenter, best known as one of the members of the Naked Samoans.

Biography
Born in Niue, Shimpal came to New Zealand at the age of four. He began acting at an early age, taking part in school productions. Theatre was the beginning of his professional career, and among his stage appearances was with the Naked Samoans in Naked Samoans Talk about Their Knives. Shimpal has since stayed with the group in later productions. The latest of the show was in December 2006 entitled Naked Samoans Go Home (Again).

In 1999, Shimpal joined the core cast of the soap opera Shortland Street, playing the role of Nurse Louie Iosefa. However, his most successful involvement with television has been bro'Town. Shimpal is credited as both voice actor and writer for the animated series with the three other original Naked Samoans. In 2006, he co-starred in the comedy film Sione's Wedding. Shimpal also works as a TV reporter for Tagata Pasifika (which co-stars Robbie Magasiva).

In 2014 he was fined $900 and banned from driving for six months for drunk-driving.

Lelisi is a castaway on the 2022 series of the New Zealand reality television show Celebrity Treasure Island.

Filmography

Film

Television

See also
 List of New Zealand television personalities

References

External links
 Profile and Biography of Shimpal on NZ On Screen

Niuean actors
New Zealand male television actors
New Zealand television presenters
Niuean emigrants to New Zealand
Living people
Year of birth missing (living people)
New Zealand male soap opera actors
20th-century New Zealand male actors
21st-century New Zealand male actors
Participants in New Zealand reality television series